The masked frog or masked rock frog (Litoria personata) is a species of frog in the subfamily Pelodryadinae, endemic to Australia. Its natural habitats are subtropical or tropical dry forests, subtropical or tropical dry lowland grassland, rivers, freshwater marshes, and intermittent freshwater marshes.

References

Litoria
Amphibians of the Northern Territory
Amphibians described in 1978
Taxonomy articles created by Polbot
Frogs of Australia